The monohalomethanes are organic compounds in which a hydrogen atom in methane is replaced by a halogen. They belong to the haloalkanes or to the subgroup of halomethanes.

The four members are fluoromethane, chloromethane, bromomethane and iodomethane.

See also 
 Dihalomethane
 Trihalomethane
 Tetrahalomethane

References